Disclaimer II is the second studio album by  South African rock band Seether. It is a recompilation of the band's first album, Disclaimer, from 2002. Although the 12 tracks from the original album are present, they have been slightly remixed and differ from the original. Also, the majority of the remixed tracks feature additional lead guitar melodies with the addition of a permanent lead guitarist to the band's line-up prior to the release of the album. This is also the first Seether album to feature contributions from their current drummer John Humphrey. In Europe, the album includes four tracks more than its predecessor; in the United States, the album has eight extra tracks, some of which had been previously released on soundtracks, such as "Hang On," which had been featured on the 2003 Daredevil soundtrack and "Out of My Way," which had been featured on the soundtrack to the 2003 horror film Freddy vs. Jason as well as the 2017 film Transformers: The Last Knight. "Fine Again" also appeared on Madden NFL 2003 and 1080° Avalanche.

A primary reason for the reworking of Disclaimer was the popularity of "Broken." Originally a simple acoustic ballad, it was remade into an electric, duet version with vocals by Evanescence frontwoman Amy Lee, who was dating Seether frontman Shaun Morgan at the time. This new version was originally featured on the 2004 Punisher soundtrack and had an accompanying music video. Both the US and European releases include the new rendition of "Broken," and Disclaimer II subsequently became Seether's most successful album commercially. The song "Sold Me", also from The Punisher soundtrack, was used for WWE's Bad Blood pay per view, along with WWE also using "Out of My Way" as the entrance theme of Zach Gowen. The song "Take Me Away" is an acoustic version of a track from their first independent album (originally as Saron Gas), Fragile (2000).

Background 
The idea of releasing Disclaimer II was a record label decision. Shaun Morgan didn't want to include the new version of "Broken" with Amy Lee on the first album, because he thought the first album was finished. Eventually, the band and the label came to a compromise; they recorded extra tracks for the album, as they wanted to include it as a bonus CD. Instead, the label discontinued the first barcode on the first album (which is why Disclaimer II is considered Seether's second album) and they had to add the new version of "Broken", as it was part of the deal.

Track listing 
All songs written by Shaun Morgan and Dale Stewart.

Tracks 1 – 12 are the same as on the original Disclaimer album, although slightly reworked. Tracks 13 – 20 did not appear on the original Disclaimer album.

Personnel
Credits adapted from album’s liner notes.

Seether
 Shaun Morgan – lead vocals and rhythm guitar
 Dale Stewart – bass guitar and backing vocals
 Pat Callahan – lead guitar

Additional musicians
 John Humphrey – drums (tracks 13-17, 20)
 Josh Freese – drums (tracks 1-12)
 Dave Cohoe – drums (track 18)
 Nick Oshiro – drums (track 19)
 Amy Lee – vocals and string arrangement (track 20)
 Double G — string arrangement (track 20)

Production
 Jay Baumgardner — producer (tracks 1-17, 19, 20), mixing (track 19)
 Jon Berkowitz — assistant mix engineer
 Dan Certa — engineer
 Alex Gibson — strings engineer (track 20)
 Emily Lazar — mastering
 Bob Marlette — producer, and engineer (tracks 13-17, 20), mixing (tracks 1-17, 20)
 Jeff Moses — assistant engineer
 Jeremy Parker — assistant engineer
 Sid Riggs — Protools recording engineer (tracks 13-17), Protools mix engineer
 Ulrich Wild — producer and mixing (track 18)

Charts

Certifications

References

2004 albums
Seether albums
Wind-up Records albums
Albums produced by Bob Marlette
Sequel albums